The Hoogovens Wijk aan Zee Steel Chess Tournament 1996 was the 58th edition of the Hoogovens Wijk aan Zee Chess Tournament. It was held in Wijk aan Zee in January 1996 and was won by Vasyl Ivanchuk.

After switching to knockout matches in 1993 and 1995, the tournament reverted to its traditional round-robin format, which it has maintained ever since.

Top-seed Vasyl Ivanchuk finished unbeaten, a point ahead of Viswanathan Anand.

{| class="wikitable" style="text-align: center;"
|+ 58th Hoogovens tournament, group A, 13–28 January 1996, Wijk aan Zee, Netherlands, Category XVII (2656)
! !! Player !! Rating !! 1 !! 2 !! 3 !! 4 !! 5 !! 6 !! 7 !! 8 !! 9 !! 10 !! 11 !! 12 !! 13 !! 14 !! Total !! TPR !! Place
|-
|-style="background:#ccffcc;"
| 1 || align=left| || 2735 ||  || ½ || 1 || ½ || ½ || 1 || ½ || 1 || 1 || ½ || ½ || ½ || ½ || 1 || 9 || 2791 || 1
|-
| 2 || align="left" | || 2725 || ½ ||  || 0 || 1 || ½ || 0 || 1 || 1 || ½ || 1 || 1 || ½ || ½ || ½ || 8 || 2738 || 2
|-
| 3 || align="left" | || 2700 || 0 || 1 ||  || ½ || ½ || 0 || ½ || 1 || ½ || ½ || ½ || 1 || 1 || ½ || 7½ || 2710 || 3
|-
| 4 || align="left" | || 2660 || ½ || 0 || ½ ||  || 1 || 1 || 0 || ½ || 0 || ½ || ½ || 1 || 1 || ½ || 7 || 2685 || 4–7
|-
| 5 || align="left" | || 2670 || ½ || ½ || ½ || 0 ||  || ½ || ½ || 0 || 1 || ½ || 1 || ½ || 1 || ½ || 7 || 2684 || 4–7
|-
| 6 || align="left" | || 2665 || 0 || 1 || 1 || 0 || ½ ||  || 1 || 0 || ½ || ½ || 0 || 1 || 1 || ½ || 7 || 2684 || 4–7
|-
| 7 || align="left" | || 2625 || ½ || 0 || ½ || 1 || ½ || 0 ||  || 1 || ½ || ½ || ½ || ½ || ½ || 1 || 7 || 2687 || 4–7
|-
| 8 || align="left" | || 2570 || 0 || 0 || 0 || ½ || 1 || 1 || 0 ||  || 1 || ½ || ½ || ½ || 1 || ½ || 6½ || 2663 || 8–9
|-
| 9 || align="left" | || 2690 || 0 || ½ || ½ || 1 || 0 || ½ || ½ || 0 ||  || ½ || 1 || 1 || 0 || 1 || 6½ || 2653 || 8–9
|-
| 10 || align="left" | || 2625 || ½ || 0 || ½ || ½ || ½ || ½ || ½ || ½ || ½ ||  || ½ || ½ || ½ || ½ || 6 || 2629 || 10
|-
| 11 || align="left" | || 2700 || ½ || 0 || ½ || ½ || 0 || 1 || ½ || ½ || 0 || ½ ||  || ½ || ½ || ½ || 5½ || 2596 || 11
|- 
| 12 || align="left" | || 2635 || ½ || ½ || 0 || 0 || ½ || 0 || ½ || ½ || 0 || ½ || ½ ||  || ½ || 1 || 5 || 2571 || 12–13
|-
| 13 || align="left" | || 2570 || ½ || ½ || 0 || 0 || 0 || 0 || ½ || 0 || 1 || ½ || ½ || ½ ||  || 1 || 5 || 2576 || 12–13
|-
| 14 || align="left" | || 2620 || 0 || ½ || ½ || ½ || ½ || ½ || 0 || ½ || 0 || ½ || ½ || 0 || 0 ||  || 4 || 2518 || 14
|}

{| class="wikitable" style="text-align: center;"
|+ 58th Hoogovens tournament, group B, 16–28 January 1996, Wijk aan Zee, Netherlands, Category X (2495)
! !! Player !! Rating !! 1 !! 2 !! 3 !! 4 !! 5 !! 6 !! 7 !! 8 !! 9 !! 10 !! 11 !! 12 !! Total !! TPR !! Place
|-
| 1 || align=left| || 2580 ||  || 1 || 1 || ½ || ½ || ½ || 1 || ½ || ½ || ½ || 1 || 1 || 8 || 2662 || 1
|-
| 2 || align="left" | || 2590 || 0 ||  || 0 || 0 || 1 || ½ || ½ || 1 || 1 || 1 || 1 || 1 || 7 || 2588 || 2
|-
| 3 || align="left" | || 2545 || 0 || 1 ||  || 1 || ½ || 1 || 0 || ½ || 0 || 1 || ½ || ½ || 6 || 2526 || 3–5
|-
| 4 || align="left" | || 2475 || ½ || 1 || 0 ||  || ½ || 0 || ½ || 0 || 1 || 1 || 1 || ½ || 6 || 2532 || 3–5
|-
| 5 || align="left" | || 2535 || ½ || 0 || ½ || ½ ||  || 1 || ½ || ½ || ½ || ½ || ½ || 1 || 6 || 2527 || 3–5
|-
| 6 || align="left" | || 2325 || ½ || ½ || 0 || 1 || 0 ||  || 1 || ½ || 0 || 1 || ½ || ½ || 5½ || 2510 || 6–7
|-
| 7 || align="left" | || 2450 || 0 || ½ || 1 || ½ || ½ || 0 ||  || ½ || 0 || 1 || ½ || 1 || 5½ || 2499 || 6–7
|-
| 8 || align="left" | || 2525 || ½ || 0 || ½ || 1 || ½ || ½ || ½ ||  || ½ || 0 || 1 || 0 || 5 || 2456 || 8–9
|-
| 9 || align="left" | || 2495 || ½ || 0 || 1 || 0 || ½ || 1 || 1 || ½ ||  || 0 || 0 || ½ || 5 || 2459 || 8–9
|-
| 10 || align="left" | || 2470 || ½ || 0 || 0 || 0 || ½ || 0 || 0 || 1 || 1 ||  || ½ || 1 || 4½ || 2432 || 10
|-
| 11 || align="left" | || 2635 || 0 || 0 || ½ || 0 || ½ || ½ || ½ || 0 || 1 || ½ ||  || ½ || 4 || 2380 || 11
|- 
| 12 || align="left" | || 2315 || 0 || 0 || ½ || ½ || 0 || ½ || 0 || 1 || ½ || 0 || ½ ||  || 3½ || 2378 || 12

|}

References

Tata Steel Chess Tournament
1996 in chess
1996 in Dutch sport